Shobal Vail Clevenger (22 October 1812 near Middletown, Ohio – 23 September 1843 at sea) was a United States sculptor.

Biography
He was the son of a New Jersey weaver, went to Cincinnati when a boy, and found occupation as a stone cutter. Having developed artistic ability, as was shown by some very creditable tombstone work, he was induced by David Guid to carve busts in freestone. His first effort in this direction was the likeness of E. S. Thomas, then editor of the Cincinnati Evening Post, which was executed directly in the stone, without the intervention of plaster.

He subsequently devoted himself to art, and transferred his studio to New York City. Among his sitters were William Henry Harrison, Henry Clay, Martin Van Buren, Daniel Webster, Edward Everett, and Washington Allston. Specimens of his work are now preserved in the art galleries of the Boston Athenaeum, the New York and Philadelphia historical societies, the Smithsonian American Art Museum, the Metropolitan Museum of Art in New York, and the Academy of Fine Arts in Philadelphia. His bust of Daniel Webster was selected by the United States Post Office as best adapted for representation on the fifteen cent U.S. postage stamp.

In 1840, he went to reside in Rome, where he executed the "North American Indian," which was the first distinctive American piece of sculpture made in Rome, and attracted a large number of Italians to his studio. While in Italy, he contracted pulmonary phthsis by inhalation of stone dust. He died when one day's sail from Gibraltar, and his body was consigned to the ocean.

Family
His son, Shobal Vail Clevenger, Jr., was a noted physician.

Notes

References

External links
Art and the empire city: New York, 1825–1861, an exhibition catalog from The Metropolitan Museum of Art (fully available online as PDF), which contains material on ___ (see index)

1812 births
1843 deaths
19th-century American sculptors
19th-century American male artists
American male sculptors
Sculptors from Ohio
People from Middletown, Ohio
American expatriates in Italy
People who died at sea
Burials at sea